Lakeside MRT station is an above-ground Mass Rapid Transit (MRT) station on the East–West line in Jurong West, Singapore. This station is built on the northwestern bank of the Jurong Lake, hence its name.

Lakeside station provides MRT access to residents living in Taman Jurong and Hong Kah. It is currently one of the three stations that serve Jurong West New Town; the other two being Boon Lay MRT station and Pioneer MRT station.

History
The station was opened on 5 November 1988 and served as the western terminal station for the East West line until Boon Lay station opened on 6 July 1990. when westbound train terminates at Platform B before it turnaround utilised nearby crossover to Platform A headed back to the East, before Boon Lay was fully opened on 6 July 1990.

Design
The station was designed with a curved Chinese roof, similar to those at the nearby Chinese Garden.

As with most of the above-ground stations built in the past along the East–West line, it was built without platform screen doors. After several successful tests at Jurong East, Yishun and Pasir Ris and eventually, installation of the half-height screen doors started on 9 June 2010 and operations commenced on 31 August that year along with Bukit Batok.

High-volume low-speed fans were installed and commenced operation on 30 November 2012. Privacy screens were installed from Lakeside MRT station to Corporation Road, excluding Lakeside crossover to minimise noise generated from their residents.

References

External links
 

Railway stations in Singapore opened in 1988
Jurong West
Mass Rapid Transit (Singapore) stations